"Pride and Joy" is a song by Texas singer/guitarist Stevie Ray Vaughan and his backup band Double Trouble.  It is an original composition by Vaughan and appeared on his 1983 Epic Records debut album Texas Flood.  "Pride and Joy" was also released as Vaughan's first single and has become one of his best-known songs.

Lyrics
"Pride and Joy" was a feature of Vaughan's live repertoire before he recorded it.  According to Double Trouble drummer Chris Layton, Vaughan wrote it for a new girlfriend at the time; somewhat ironically, a later fight with her inspired "I'm Cryin'".

Composition
Called "a classic Texas shuffle", it has a twelve-bar blues arrangement, notated in the key of E (although with Vaughan's guitar tuned one-half step lower, resulting in the pitch of E) in  time with a moderately fast tempo.  The main guitar figure features a bassline along with muted chord chops to produce a percussive-like effect.  Vaughan also "extracts extra sound from the guitar by choosing finger shapes that allow the maximum number of strings to ring at a time (often the top E-string [E])".

Charts
Vaughan's song was released as a single and reached number 20 on Billboard magazine's 
Mainstream Rock chart.

References

1983 songs
Stevie Ray Vaughan songs
Songs written by Stevie Ray Vaughan
Epic Records singles